The PBA World Series of Bowling (WSOB) is an annual multi-tournament ten-pin bowling event held by the Professional Bowlers Association (PBA) in North America.

Formation
The inaugural World Series of Bowling event was held by the PBA at the start of the 2009–10 PBA Tour season (August 2 through September 6, 2009), and took place in the Detroit, Michigan suburbs of Allen Park and Taylor. Part of the reason for developing the World Series, given the U.S. economic recession at the time, was to consolidate multiple tournaments into one location to save on travel and broadcast crew costs.  The World Series included five “animal pattern” tournaments (Cheetah, Viper, Chameleon, Scorpion and Shark), each named for a custom lane-oiling pattern. All of the animal pattern tournaments took place in Allen Park's Thunderbowl Lanes. A stand-alone tournament at nearby Taylor Lanes, the Motor City Open, was also considered part of the inaugural World Series of Bowling.  In addition to being stand-alone title tournaments, the animal pattern events served as initial qualifying for that season's PBA World Championship major. While television tapings for the final rounds of the Motor City Open and all five animal pattern tournaments took place September 5 and 6, the PBA World Championship finals were not held until December 13, 2009 in Wichita, Kansas.

History
World Series of Bowling II moved to Las Vegas for the 2010–11 season. The event had five animal oil pattern events, with the PBA World Championship again running in a split format (qualifying in late October through early November, 2010, with the final rounds on January 14–16, 2011). Subsequent events ran only four or three animal pattern tournaments, but continued to use these events as initial qualifying for the PBA World Championship. After being held in Las Vegas for the next four years, the event moved to Reno, Nevada for three consecutive seasons.

The World Series of Bowling has run every PBA season since its inception, except for 2018. After Fox Sports acquired the PBA television rights earlier that year, the decision was made to move the World Series to a spring event so it would be included in Fox's TV schedule. Thus, World Series of Bowling X was moved from late 2018 to March 2019, and was held in its original home of Allen Park, MI.

Tournament formats and qualifying have changed over the years. For the 2023 season, the WSOB has a maximum field of 96 entrants. Priority registration is given to the top 50 PBA players in 2022 season points, 20 international invitees not in the top 50, and up to 16 other PBA Tour title holders making up a maximum 86 priority entries. The other 10 entries come from an eight-game Pre-Tournament Qualifier (PTQ). If the number of priority entries is below 86, more spots are filled from the PTQ.

Event Results

World Series of Bowling I
Dates:  August 2–September 6, 2009 and December 13, 2009
Location: Allen Park, MI, except where noted

Events:

World Series of Bowling II
Dates:  October 25–November 6, 2010 and January 14–16, 2011
Location: Las Vegas, Nevada

Events:

World Series of Bowling III
Dates:  November 5–19, 2011
Location: Las Vegas, Nevada

Events:

Notes: WSOB III was the first and only World Series in which all events were won by players from outside North America.

World Series of Bowling IV
Dates:  November 3–11, 2012
Location: Las Vegas, Nevada

Events:

World Series of Bowling V
Dates:  October 25–November 3, 2013
Location: Las Vegas, Nevada

Events:

World Series of Bowling VI
Dates:  October 25–November 2, 2014
Location: Las Vegas, Nevada

Events:

World Series of Bowling VII
Dates:  December 8–19, 2015
Location: Reno, Nevada

Events:

World Series of Bowling VIII
Dates:  November 29–December 11, 2016
Location: Reno, Nevada

Events:

World Series of Bowling IX
Dates:  November 8–19, 2017
Location: Reno, Nevada

Events:

World Series of Bowling X
Dates:  March 12–21, 2019
Location: Allen Park, Michigan

Events:

World Series of Bowling XI
Dates:  March 6–15, 2020 & October 1–5, 2020
Location: Las Vegas, Nevada & Centreville, Virginia

The PBA's World Series of Bowling XI. which includes three standard PBA title events and the PBA World Championship, was scheduled to take place March 6–18, 2020 in Las Vegas, with live finals broadcasts occurring across four consecutive days on FS1 (one Sunday afternoon broadcast on March 15, followed by three prime time evening broadcasts on March 16–18). However, due to the coronavirus pandemic, only the PBA World Championship was completed in March. The match play rounds and finals of the other three tournaments were postponed, and eventually rescheduled for October 1–5, 2020. The location for the animal pattern tournament conclusions was also changed to Centreville, Virginia, allowing it to follow the PBA League event.

Events:

World Series of Bowling XII
Dates:  March 5–17, 2021
Location: Tampa, Florida

The PBA announced on January 15, 2021 that World Series of Bowling XII would take place in Tampa, Florida on March 7–17, with a pre-tournament qualifier (PTQ) on March 5. As in the previous season, WSOB XII included three animal pattern events (Cheetah, Chameleon, Scorpion) plus the PBA World Championship major. This season's WSOB also hosted the Roth-Holman PBA Doubles Championship. Combined pinfall from the three animal pattern qualifying rounds determines the top 30 that move on to the PBA World Championship cashers round, and also determines the top 16 teams that advance to the Roth-Holman Doubles match play rounds.

World Series of Bowling XIII
Dates:  March 3–16, 2022
Location: Wauwatosa, Wisconsin

World Series of Bowling XIII took place in Wauwatosa, WI on March 3–16, with a pre-tournament qualifier (PTQ) on March 1. As in the previous season, WSOB XIII includes three animal pattern events (Cheetah, Scorpion, Shark) plus the PBA World Championship major. Combined pinfall from the three animal pattern qualifying rounds determines the top 30 that move on to the PBA World Championship cashers round. This season's WSOB opens with the Roth-Holman PBA Doubles Championship.

References

Ten-pin bowling competitions in the United States